Yara is a 2021 Italian film directed by Marco Tullio Giordana, written by Graziano Diana and starring Chiara Bono, Isabella Ragonese, Alessio Boni and Roberto Zibetti. Based on a true story, the film follows an Italian Prosecutor, and her attempts to find the killer of 13-year-old Yara Gambirasio. The film was released by Netflix on November 5, 2021.

Cast 
 Chiara Bono as Yara Gambirasio
 Isabella Ragonese
 Alessio Boni
 Roberto Zibetti
 Aiman Machhour as Mohamed Fikri
 Mario Pirrello
 Sandra Toffolatti
 Thomas Trabacchi
 Lorenzo Acquaviva as Avvocato Claudio Salvagni
 Donatella Bartoli as Yara School Teacher
 Andrea Bruschi
 Guglielmo Favilla as Tenente Colonnello Emiliani
 Nicole Fornaro as Yara Gym Teacher
 Miro Landoni

References

External links
 
 

2021 films
Italian drama films
2020s Italian-language films
Italian-language Netflix original films